"Take It Back" is a 1994 song by Pink Floyd.

Take It Back may also refer to:
"Take It Back" (Cream song), 1967
"Take It Back" (The J. Geils Band song), 1978
"Take It Back" (Reba McEntire song), 1992
"Take It Back" (Snot song), 2000
"Take It Back" (Toddla T song), 2011
 "Take it Back", a track from Ed Sheeran's deluxe edition of X
"Take it Back", a track from Logic's 2017 album Everybody
Food for Thought/Take It Back, a compilation album by Gray Matter

See also
Take It Back, Take It On, Take It Over!, a 2005 album by 7 Seconds